Harold William Dainty (2 June 1892 – 17 April 1961) was an English cricketer.  Dainty was a right-handed batsman who bowled right-arm fast.  He was born at Rushton, Northamptonshire.

Dainty made three first-class appearances for Northamptonshire in the 1922 County Championship against Lancashire, Yorkshire and Essex.  In his three first-class matches, he scored 20 runs at an average of 6.66, with a high score of 8.  With the ball he bowled a total of thirteen overs, though without taking any wickets.

He died at Kettering, Northamptonshire on 17 April 1961.

References

External links
Harold Dainty at ESPNcricinfo
Harold Dainty at CricketArchive

1890s births
1961 deaths
People from North Northamptonshire
English cricketers
Northamptonshire cricketers